Mạc Thái Tông (1500 – 25 January 1540), known also by his given name Mạc Đăng Doanh, was the second emperor of the Mạc dynasty of Vietnam from 1530 to 1540. His father, Mạc Thái Tổ, was still alive during the first year of his reign and also reigning as “senior emperor” (Thái thượng hoàng). His posthumous name is Văn hoàng đế, and his era name is Đại Chính.



History
Mạc Đăng Doanh was born in Cao Đôi village, Bình Hà district (present-day Nam Tan, Nam Sách District, Hải Dương Province). His father was Mac Dang Dung, and his mother was Nguyễn Thị Ngọc Toàn. He was the oldest son of Mac Dang Dung. After Mac Dang Dung seized the throne from Emperor Lê Chiêu Tông and established the Mạc dynasty in 1527, he made his oldest son crown prince. Mac Dang Doanh died on 25 January 1540 after reigning for 10 years. His full posthumous name is Thái Tông Khâm triết Văn hoàng đế.

References

1540 deaths
Mạc dynasty emperors
People from Haiphong
Year of birth unknown
Vietnamese monarchs